Bryan Volpenhein (born August 18, 1976), is an American rower. He is a three-time Olympian, having participated in the 2000, 2004 and 2008 Summer Olympics.

Originally from Cincinnati, Volpenhein graduated from Kings High School in Kings Mills, Ohio and attended Ohio State University, where he rowed for The Ohio State University Crew Club alongside coach John Gutrich; former Purdue lightweight rower, and coached by Tim Carrigg and Lou Renzulli. He graduated in 2002. Following the 2005 World Rowing Championships, he studied culinary arts at The Art Institute of Seattle.

Rowing career 
Volpenhein is the only two-time winner (in 2002 and 2004) of the USRowing Male Athlete of the Year award. In addition, he and his team were named "USATODAY.com's U.S. Olympic Athlete of the Week" following their gold medal win in 2004. Volpenhein won bronze in the men's eight at the 2008 Olympics.

Volpenhein became the Head Coach of the University of Pennsylvania Men's Heavyweight Rowing Team in the 2019–2020 season. Volpenhein was previously the Training and Technical Director at the University of San Diego Men's Rowing team for the 2018–2019 season and the Junior Men's Varsity Head Coach at the San Diego Rowing Club in 2019.

Notes

References
USRowing Biography
2008 Olympic Biography
USA Today article

1976 births
American chefs
American male chefs
Living people
Ohio State Buckeyes rowers
Olympic bronze medalists for the United States in rowing
Olympic gold medalists for the United States in rowing
Sportspeople from Cincinnati
People from Princeton, New Jersey
Rowers at the 2000 Summer Olympics
Rowers at the 2004 Summer Olympics
Rowers at the 2008 Summer Olympics
American male rowers
Medalists at the 2008 Summer Olympics
Medalists at the 2004 Summer Olympics
World Rowing Championships medalists for the United States